Rezvankadeh (also Romanized as Reẕvānkadeh) is a village in Muzaran Rural District, in the Central District of Malayer County, Hamadan Province, Iran. At the 2006 census, its population was 1,885, in 495 families.

References 

Populated places in Malayer County